Sainte-Croix-sur-Orne (literally Sainte-Croix on Orne) is a former commune in the Orne department in north-western France. On 1 January 2016, it was merged into the new commune of Putanges-le-Lac. The 18th-century military, playwright and physician Guillaume-René Lefébure (1744–1806) was born in Sainte-Croix-sur-Orne.

See also
 Communes of the Orne department

References

Saintecroixsurorne